Giuliano Oliviero (born February 26, 1974) is a Canadian former soccer midfielder and currently the head coach of the Milwaukee Wave in the Major Arena Soccer League.

Outdoor career

Club
He first began to play professional soccer with the Edmonton Brick Men in 1990, he then had stints with London Lasers in 1992. In 1993, he played in the Canadian National Soccer Leaguewith the Winnipeg Fury. He signed with the Vancouver 86ers where he recorded 9 goals  and was named the A-League Rookie of the Year, and was named into the First Team All A-League selection. The same year he began his indoor career with the Milwaukee Wave United where he finished fourth on the team in scoring (89 points) and assists (24), and was runner-up for NPSL Rookie of the Year and was named to the NPSL's All-Rookie First Team.

In 1997, Oliviero joined the Montreal Impact, and was with the club until 2002 for all but one season.  His best season with the Impact was 1998 when he recorded 27 points on 8 goals and 11 assists.  He tallied a total of 18 goals in 115 games.  Oliveiro played for Staten Island Vipers in 1999 when the Impact were not in operation.

In 2003, Oliviero joined Montreal's rival the Toronto Lynx, leaving the team with 115 games played and 18 career goals for the Impact. His signing along with Brian Ashton was announced  on April 10, 2003. During his tenure with the Lynx he played eight games and scored one goal, and assisted Toronto to finish second in the standings for the Voyageurs Cup. He played his last outdoor season with the Milwaukee Wave United in 2004, but after the conclusion of the 2004 season the franchise would fold from. In total he recorded 36 goals and 111 points in the USL First Division.

International
Oliviero played for the Canada U-20 men's national soccer team in 1991 and 1992 and made his senior debut for the Canada national soccer team in an October 1995 friendly match against Chile. That game would remain his only international.

Indoor career
In 2003, he began his second stint with the Wave where he played his 100th career regular season game with Wave on 3/14 vs. Baltimore. The following season, he was the team's second leading scorer with 40 points on 17 goals and 23 assists and helped the team win their first League Title.

Personal life
Oliviero is coaching director and coach of SC Waukesha Boys U-14.

External links
Profile - Milwaukee Wave

References

1974 births
Living people
Sportspeople from New Westminster
Canadian people of Italian descent
Soccer people from British Columbia
UBC Thunderbirds soccer players
Canadian soccer players
Canadian expatriate soccer players
Canada men's international soccer players
Expatriate soccer players in the United States
Canadian expatriate sportspeople in the United States
Cleveland Crunch players
Edmonton Brick Men players
London Lasers players
Winnipeg Fury players
Vancouver Whitecaps (1986–2010) players
Montreal Impact (1992–2011) players
Staten Island Vipers players
Toronto Lynx players
Toronto ThunderHawks players
Milwaukee Wave United players
Milwaukee Wave players
Canadian Soccer League (1987–1992) players
Canadian National Soccer League players
USL First Division players
Canadian beach soccer players
National Professional Soccer League (1984–2001) players
Major Indoor Soccer League (2008–2014) players
Canada men's youth international soccer players
Association football defenders
Major Arena Soccer League coaches